The 1912 season of the Paraguayan Primera División, the top category of Paraguayan football, was played by 4 teams. The national champions were Olimpia.

Results

Standings

External links
Paraguay 1912 season at RSSSF

Paraguayan Primera División seasons
Para
1